Central High School (formerly Central Academy of Excellence) is a high school located at 3221 Indiana Avenue in Kansas City, Missouri. It is part of the Kansas City Public Schools. Central was established in 1884 in order to help educate the growing population of Kansas City. The school colors are blue and white and the school's athletic teams are referred to as the "Eagles". Central has an enrollment of approximately 1,000 students annually.

School background

The high school is located in front of Central Middle School building at the corner of Linwood Boulevard and Indiana Avenue. It features a large, one-acre square field house, Greek-style theatre, and an Olympic-sized swimming pool with one- and three- meter diving boards.

Central Academy was also part of the now defunct magnet program which was a response to a court-mandated, forced desegregation plan that was designed to try and lure students from the suburbs with targeted programs. As part of this effort, Central High School was rebuilt and renamed to Central Computers Unlimited / Classical Greek Magnet High School.

The two magnet themes were not complementary to each other and most of the money spent on the new facility went to the Classical Greek theme for sports-related facilities like a fully outfitted weight room (inspired by the weight room of the Kansas City Chiefs), two indoor racquetball courts, a field house, a fully equipped gymnastics training facility, and an Olympic-sized swimming pool.

The Computers Unlimited theme brought with it a fully networked classroom environment with computers in most classrooms and a Novell NetWare v3.11 network. There was also a small robotics lab; a video, photography, and graphics lab; and a CAD lab. The cost to taxpayers for the new facility was over $32 million. It was completed in 1991. Unfortunately, the new facilities and programs were not enough to bring in and retain suburban students in this and other magnet program schools. The program was an abject failure by any measure and was abandoned. The references to the magnet themes were removed from the school's name, and it was returned to a normal curriculum.

Name change
In July 2012, KCPS unanimously approved the proposal to change the school's name from Central High School to Central Academy of Excellence. The name change officially went into effect for the 2012-2013 school year. The proposal had been heavily promoted by the school's current principal Linda Collins, who strives "to put a new name on what the principal hopes will be a transformed school on the inside." There are also hopes for getting more technology into the classrooms and instilling stronger discipline.

Notable alumni
 Ralph Barton, 1920s cartoonist
 Kutt Calhoun, rapper signed with Strange Music
 George Creel, journalist and head of the WWI-era Committee on Public Information
 Walt Disney, animator; multiple Oscar Award winner; innovator
 Derek Hood, professional basketball player, class of 1995
 Muna Lee, Olympic sprinter, class of 2000
 Irene C. Peden, first female American engineer or scientist to conduct research in the Antarctic
 William Powell, actor; three-time nominee for Academy Award for Best Actor
 Lee Shippey, writer and columnist
 Casey Stengel, Hall of Fame Major League Baseball player and manager; led the New York Yankees to 7 World Series Championships
Joe Shannon, Representative for Missouri's 5th congressional district and Democratic political boss

References

External links
 
 

High schools in Kansas City, Missouri
Educational institutions established in 1884
Public high schools in Missouri
1884 establishments in Missouri